The 1990 Baseball World Cup (BWC) was the 31st international Men's amateur baseball tournament. The tournament was sanctioned by the International Baseball Federation, which titled it the Amateur World Series from the 1938 tournament through the 1986 AWS. The tournament was held, for the only time, in Canada from August 4 to 19. Cuba defeated Nicaragua in the final to win its 20th title.

There were 12 participating countries, with all games played at the John Ducey Park in the city of Edmonton.

The next eight competitions were also held as the BWC tournament, then was replaced in 2015 by the quadrennial WBSC Premier12.

First round

Pool A

Pool B

Second round

Pool C

Pool D

Pool E

Final round

7th place game

5th place game

Bronze medal game

Final

Final standings

Awards

References

External links
XXXI Baseball World Cup - XXXI Copa del Mundo de Béisbol
Archives 1990 

World Cup
Baseball World Cup
Baseball World Cup
1990
Sports competitions in Edmonton
1990 in Alberta
1990s in Edmonton
August 1990 sports events in Canada
Baseball in Edmonton